Guilherme Costa Marques (born 21 May 1991), known simply as Guilherme, is a Brazilian professional footballer who plays for Chinese Super League club Guangzhou City.

Club career

SC Braga
Born in Três Rios, Brazil, Guilherme began playing futsal and trained at a football school. As he grew older, began to take football seriously. Guilherme then started out his career at Paraíba do Sul before moving to Portugal, where he joined Braga in 2009 at age sixteen. Immediately after joining the club, Guilherme was assigned to the youth team.

It wasn't until on 24 January 2010 when he made his SC Braga first team debut, starting the whole game, in a 4–1 win over Leiria. He also appeared as an unused substitute in a league match against Vitória on 6 March 2010. For the remaining part of the 2009–10 season, Guilherme appeared in a number of matches as an unused substitute, as he made one appearance for the side.

Ahead of the 2010–11 season, Guilherme was promoted to Braga's senior squad. His first appearance of the season came on 21 August 2010, where he came on as a second–half substitute, in a 0–0 draw against Vitória. It wasn't until on 22 January 2011 when Guilherme scored his first goal of the season, in a 2–2 draw against Vitória. Eight days later, on 30 January 2011, he scored again in the third round of Taça da Liga, in a 4–0 win over Arouca. At the end of the 2010–11 season, Guilherme went on to make eight appearances and scoring once in all competitions. During the season, he was linked a move away from SC Braga, as Juventus, Manchester City and FC Barcelona were interested in signing him.

The start of 2011–12 season saw Guilherme making one appearance, which came on 25 August 2011, where he set up a goal for Lima in a 2–2 draw against BSC Young Boys in the second leg of the UEFA Qualification Play–Off and saw the club go through to the Group Stage, thanks to away goal. After spending the 2011–12 season on loan at Gil Vicente, Guilherme was sent to the Braga B team for the whole 2012–13 season. At Braga B team, Guilherme received a handful of playing time despite being called up from the senior team. He also helped the side reach the final of final against S.L. Benfica, which they lost 2–1. Despite being sent–off on two occasions, Guilherme went on to make twenty–six appearances and scoring four times for Braga B team.

It was announced on 19 June 2013 that Guilherme's future at the SC Braga was in doubt, leading the club become more interested in signing him. He spent the rest of the year, training for the reserve side. It was announced on 10 January 2014 that Guilherme was expected to leave SC Braga, either having his contract terminated or on loan.

Loan Spells
In the first part of the following season, Guilherme was loaned to Segunda Liga side Vizela, where he made seven appearances for the side.

For the 2011–12 season, Guilherme was loaned out to Gil Vicente for the rest of the season. Guilherme made his Gil Vicente debut on 16 September 2011, where he came on as a second-half substitute, in a 2–2 draw against Olhanense. The following month, on 27 October 2011 in the Taça da Liga campaign, he scored his first goal for Gil Vicente, scoring from a penalty, in a 2–1 loss against Belenenses. Throughout the 2011–2012 season, Guilherme went on to make twenty–six appearances and scoring once in all competitions.

Legia Warsaw
On 14 January 2014, it was announced that Guilherme was loaned out to Legia Warsaw for the next twelve months. Upon joining the club, Guilherme became the twelve Brazilian player to join Legia Warsaw.

Guilherme made his Legia Warsaw debut on 14 February 2014, where he started the match before being substituted in the 74th minute, in a 1–0 win over Korona Kielce. After making another appearance, he, however, suffered a ruptured intraarticular ligament initiation in the ankle that saw him sidelined until the end of the 2013–14 season. By the time he suffered a rupture to his ankle, Guilherme went on to make two appearances for the side this season. Despite this, he went on to win February's Player of the Month by the club's supporters. During his injury, the club went on to win the league.

At the start of the 2014–15 season, Guilherme remained sidelined from the first team, due to suffering from injury. It wasn't until on 17 October 2014 when he made his return from injury, coming on as a substitute, where Legia Warsaw beat Lechia Gdańsk 1–0. Four days later, on 22 October 2014, he made his first start as a left–back since returning from injury, in a 1–0 win over Metalist Kharkiv in the group stage of the UEFA Europa League. Since returning to the first team from injury, Guilherme regained his first team place, playing in the left–back position. The following month on 14 January 2015, it was announced that Guilherme signed for Legia Warsaw on a permanent basis, signing a three–year contract. After losing his place by the returning Tomasz Brzyski, Guilherme regained his first team place in attacking position, although he occasionally played at the left–back position. His first goal for the club came on 29 April 2015, where he scored an equaliser, in a 2–1 win over Pogoń Szczecin. Three days later, on 2 May 2015, Guilherme helped the beat Lech Poznań, who went on to win the league, 2–1 in the Polish Cup final. Despite being sidelined several times later in the 2014–15 season, Guilherme went on to make thirty appearances and scoring once for the side.

At the start of the 2015–16 season, Guilherme remained in the first team regular for the side, where he played in the right–wing position despite competing with Michał Kucharczyk. He started the season well when he scored in the second leg of the UEFA Europa League Qualification against FC Botoșani, in a 3–0 win to advance to the next round. A month later, on 27 August 2015, Guilherme scored again in the play–offs round of the UEFA Europa League, in a 3–2 win over Zorya Luhansk to advance to the Group Stage. Three days later, on 30 August 2015, he scored his first league goal of the season, in a 1–1 draw against Jagiellonia Białystok. His performance at Legia Warsaw attracted interests from Serie A side Inter Milan, but the move never happened. After being sidelined on two separate matches between late–February and early–March, Guilherme scored on his return from the sidelines on 12 March 2016, in a 2–1 win over KS Cracovia. The following month, he scored the second leg of the semi–final of the Polish Cup, in a 2–1 win over Zawisza Bydgoszcz to reach the final; which they beat Lech Poznań again in the Polish Cup final for the second time in a row. After adding his eighth goal of the season against Piast Gliwice on 8 May 2016, Guilherme helped the side win the league. At the end of the 2015–16 season, he went on to make 55 appearances and scoring 8 times in all competitions.

At the start of the 2016–17 season, Guilherme started the season when he scored the club's first goal of the season, as Legia Warrsaw lost 4–1 to Lech Poznań in the Polish SuperCup. But he soon suffered a shoulder injury during a 2–0 win over Zrinjski Mostar in the second leg of the UEFA Champions League second round and was sidelined for a month. He then made his return from injury on 20 August 2016 against Arka Gdynia, where he came on as a second-half substitute and set up a goal for Kasper Hämäläinen, in a 3–1 loss. Since returning from a shoulder injury, Guilherme regained his first team place, playing in the right–wing position. On 1 October 2016, Guilherme scored a brace, scoring from the first and second goal of the game, in a 3–0 win over Lechia Gdańsk. Then, on 7 December 2016, he scored his first UEFA Champions League goal, in a 1–0 win over Sporting CP, their first win of the UEFA Champions League's Group Stage. The following month saw the club opened a contract negotiation to convince Guilherme stay at the club beyond 2018, whose contract was expected to expire. Later in the 2016–17 season, he helped the club win the league for the second time in a row on the last game of the season. Despite being sidelined later in the 2016–17 season, he went on to make 41 appearances and scoring 7 times in all competitions.

Ahead of the 2017–18 season, Guilherme was linked away from the club, as Sporting CP and Trabzonspor were among interested. Despite this, Guilherme stayed at the club and started the season when he set up the equaliser for Thibault Moulin to score against Arka Gdynia in the Polish SuperCup on 7 July 2017; leading the match to extra–time and penalty shoot–out, where he successfully converted the shootout, but lost 4–3 in the penalty shoot–out. He then scored in both legs of the UEFA Champions League Second Round Qualification against IFK Mariehamn in a 9–0 on aggregate to advance to the next round. However, Guilherme was sidelined for a month after suffering a knee injury during a 1–1 draw against Sheriff Tiraspol in a UEFA Europa League Play–Off Round match in the first leg. After returning to training, he didn't make his return to the first team on 1 October 2017, coming on as a second-half substitute, in a 3–0 loss against Lech Poznan. Guilherme then scored two goals in two matches on 9 December 2017 and 12 December 2017 against Bruk-Bet Termalica Nieciecza and Piast Gliwice. It was announced on 8 December 2017 that Guilherme was not signing a new contract with Legia Warsaw and expected to leave the club when the transfer window opens next month. His last appearance, which also coincidentally turns out to be his 150th appearance for Legia Warsaw, came on 16 December 2017, in a 2–0 loss against Wisła Płock. After the match, he made a farewell statements, thanking the club during his four years spell there. By the time he departed the club, Guilherme's contribution to the club winning the league this season, where he made 22 appearances and scoring five times, earned him a medal.

During his time at Legia Warsaw, Guilherme made 150 appearances and scoring 21 times, as he helped the side win the Polish Cup on two occasions and the league on three occasions. He was also the club's fan favourite, due to his dribbling and shooting skills.

Benevento
With his contract not being renewed, Guilherme was linked a move to Serie A side Benevento, who was at 20th place at the time, and was looking for reinforcements to help the side avoid relegation. On 16 December 2017, Italian media Tutto Mercato Web reported that Guilherme agreed a deal to join the club. However, his move to Benevento was delayed over paperwork issues. Eventually, it was announced on 19 January 2018 that he joined Benevento.

Guilherme made his Benevento debut on 21 January 2018 against Bologna, where he started the whole game, in a 3–0 loss. After his making his debut, Eurosport gave his performance 6/10, commenting: "Encouraging the performance of the last arrived; in the first part of the race he sows panic in the opposing defence." His first goal came on 11 February 2018, in a 5–2 loss against Roma. A month later on 31 March 2018, he scored again, which saw Benevento lost 6–2 loss against Lazio. However, Guilherme suffered ankle injury during a 2–2 draw against Sassuolo on 15 April 2018 and was expected to be out for the rest of the season. While on the sidelines, the club were relegated to Serie B after spending one season at Serie A. But in the last game of the season, he made his return from injury on 20 May 2018 against Chievo, starting the whole game, in a 1–0 loss. During the second half of the 2017–18 season, Guilherme made twelve appearances with two goals in league competition.

Following the club's relegation, Guilherme was linked a move away from Benevento despite being keen on playing in Serie B next season.

Alvarenga
On 1 July 2018, Guilherme joined Portuguese club GD Santa Cruz Alvarenga.

Yeni Malatyaspor (loan)
It was announced on 4 August 2018 that Guilherme joined Yeni Malatyaspor on a season–long deal for the 2018–19 season.

Guilherme made his Yeni Malatyaspor debut in the opening game of the season, where he started the match before being substituted in the 81st minute, in a 3–1 win over Göztepe. In a follow up match against Fenerbahçe seven days later on 19 August 2018, he played a vital role for the side when he set up a goal for Danijel Aleksić to score the only goal in the game, in a 1–0 victory. On 15 September 2018, Guilherme scored his first goal for the club, in a 2–1 loss against Beşiktaş. Then, on 9 November 2018, he scored a brace and set up two of the other three goals, in a 5–0 win over Trabzonspor. Since joining the club, he quickly established himself in the starting eleven and impressed the management with his display. Despite suffering an injury and facing suspension at separate times towards the end of the year, Guilherme then scored again and was sent–off later in the game, in a 1–1 draw against Bursaspor on 23 December 2018. After suffering an injury and facing suspension at separate times once again in early–January, Guilherme made his return to the first team on 28 January 2019, in a 3–2 loss against Fenerbahçe.

Trabzonspor (loan)
On 31 January 2020, Guilherme joined Trabzonspor on loan for the remainder of the 2019–20 season.

Göztepe (loan)
On 1 October 2020, Göztepe signed Guilherme on a two-year loan with an option to buy.

Style of Play
Guilherme plays in an offensive midfielder and prefers to play in the middle position. Goal.com said about Guilherme, commenting: "he's a Brazilian of great creativity and imagination, able to make himself valuable for his team with a play of class or a winning assist for his teammate".

During at his early career at Legia Warsaw, Guilherme also played in the left–back position, reflecting: "At this point I focus on the left defense, because I'm needed there. Therefore, I listen to many comments, watch matches, analyzing the players' play in this position. For sure, the fact that I'm doing so well on left defense is caused by the help of the training staff. There really was no conversation with the trainer about the game on the left defense."

Club statistics

1 Including Polish SuperCup.

Personal life
Guilherme mentioned in an interview with Gol 24 that he has a wife, implying that he's married. During the same interview, he's currently learning Polish and spoke English and occasionally Portuguese when he was at Legia Warsaw. Having spent four years in Poland, he applied for the Polish Citizenship to help the club reduce the limit of foreigners in the league. In February 2018, Guilherme became a first time father.

Growing up in Três Rios, Brazil, Guilherme revealed that he stayed all day on the pitch that "sometime his mother came for me because I forgot about the dinner". Although he described his mother as "strict", due to the fact that "she did not always like that him spending so much time playing football" and "demanding", she, nevertheless, supported him. He also grew up supporting Flamengo. He also have a tattoo that said: "Minha Família é minha vida" (translated "My family is my life") in his right arm. Guilherme also has a brother.

Honours

Club 

Legia Warsaw
Ekstraklasa: 2013–14, 2015–16, 2016–17, 2017–18
Polish Cup: 2014–15, 2015–16, 2017–18

Trabzonspor
Turkish Cup: 2019–20

References

External links
 
 Guilherme cedido ao Gil Vicente
 
 

1991 births
Living people
Brazilian footballers
Brazilian expatriate footballers
Primeira Liga players
Ekstraklasa players
Serie A players
Süper Lig players
S.C. Braga players
S.C. Braga B players
F.C. Vizela players
Gil Vicente F.C. players
Legia Warsaw players
Benevento Calcio players
Yeni Malatyaspor footballers
Trabzonspor footballers
Göztepe S.K. footballers
Expatriate footballers in Portugal
Expatriate footballers in Poland
Expatriate footballers in Italy
Expatriate footballers in Turkey
Brazilian expatriate sportspeople in Portugal
Brazilian expatriate sportspeople in Poland
Brazilian expatriate sportspeople in Italy
Brazilian expatriate sportspeople in Turkey
Association football midfielders
People from Três Rios